Yeh Ting-jen (born July 1, 1983 in Taiwan) is a Taiwanese baseball player who currently plays for Brother Elephants of Chinese Professional Baseball League. He is a pitcher who throws and bats left-handed.

He pitched for the Lowell Spinners minor league team in the New York Penn league in 2006, playing in 9 games, with a record of 1-0 and an Earned run average of 9.53 and batted .400 as well. The Lowell Spinners are a minor-league affiliate of the Boston Red Sox.

Career statistics

See also
 Chinese Professional Baseball League
 Brother Elephants

References

External links
 

1983 births
Living people
Brother Elephants players
Baseball players from New Taipei
Fu Jen Catholic University alumni